Katy de la Cruz (born Catalina Mangahas de la Cruz; February 13, 1907 – November 10, 2004) was a leading Filipina singer who specialized in jazz vocals and torch songs in a hon career that lasted eight decades.  Hailed as "The Queen of Filipino Jazz" and as "The Queen of Bodabil", she was, by the age of 18, the highest paid entertainer in the Philippines. De la Cruz also appeared in films and received a FAMAS Best Supporting Actress Award in 1953.

Early life
Catalina de la Cruz was born in Bustos, Bulacan. Even as a young child, de la Cruz would be hired to sing at town fiestas, and at intermissions during cockfights and boxing matches. Her formal schooling ended at the third grade.

In 1914, when she was seven years old, she was hired by the owner of a Manila film theater to sing to the audiences in between movie screenings. Such performances were typical in Manila theaters during that period, and from those routines would emerge a distinct genre eventually known as bodabil. She learned her songs through listening to phonograph records, and mastered the English language with the help of her brother.

Bodabil star
By the age of thirteen, de la Cruz was a rising star in the bodabil circuit, performing alongside other leading stage performers such as Atang de la Rama. She soon became a solo headliner, performing in Manila's largest theaters such as the Savoy, the Palace, and the Lux. By 1925, de la Cruz was the highest paid entertainer in the Philippines. She fell in love, and later married, the piano player of her stage show. Some of the chorus girls who performed alongside her onstage, such as Chichay, Etang Discher, and Mary Walter, later become prominent entertainers in their own right.

De la Cruz was acknowledged as a proficient performer of torch songs who drew comparisons to Sophie Tucker.

Initially, her signature tune was the bluesy ballad St. Louis Blues. After jazz became popular in the Philippines in the 1920s, de la Cruz adapted her singing style and soon mastered the art of scat singing, which became a trademark of hers. By the 1930s, de la Cruz would be most identified with the song Balut, a fast-paced jazzy tune written by Jerry Brandy. Her take on the song, which afforded her to showcase her scatting ability, has been described as impish and rustic, rounded out by her low, playfully dragging key. A slightly bawdy take, called "Balut", named for a notorious Filipino culinary delicacy of the same name, remains popular to date, with versions performed by the New Minstrels, Pilita Corrales, and Lani Misalucha.

She also occasionally acted in films, most prominently in Inspirasyon (1953), for which she received the FAMAS Best Supporting Actress Award in 1953. Many of her films were for Sampaguita Pictures.

Later career
As bodabil slowly declined, de la Cruz concentrated on concert performances and international tours. In the late 1940s and early 1950s, she was a top-billed performer at the famed Forbidden City nightclub in San Francisco. In 1961, she starred in her own stage show in Las Vegas. De la Cruz also performed concert tours in Thailand, Taiwan, Hong Kong, Singapore, Australia, and Hawaii.

De la Cruz eventually retired to San Francisco, California, though she would occasionally perform until the late 1980s. In 1989, she visited the Philippines to attend the premiere at the Cultural Center of the Philippines of Katy!, a highly publicized stage musical based on her life.

Family
Of de la Cruz's four children, her daughters Angie and Ronnie followed her into showbusiness, pairing with Nikki Ross to form Wing Trio, a singing group that was popular on the bodabil circuit and in films during the 1950s. When Ronnie got married, both Angie and Nikki continued on as the Wing Duo. Elena Figueroa is her oldest child, a journalist who immigrated to the United States and married Edward Figueroa (deceased), a US veteran and a chef. Elena's children consist of James Figueroa, John Figueroa, Mary Ann Figueroa. James (Jimy) has 2 biological children, Alexander James and Katelyn Figueroa. Mary Ann has 3 children Davin, Chelsea, and Therese, and raised Alexander James (AJ) and Kaitlyn (Kaity) Figueroa. John is married to Shannen and has 2 sons Joseph and Brandon. Ronnie (Veronica) Teator (deceased) is the second oldest of Katy's children and was married to Jerry, retired US Veteran and retired postal worker, who lives in California. They have four children - Kathryn, Teresa, Toni and Jeffrey. Kathryn is married to Ron Aviles and has three children named Taylor, Alexandra and Lauren. Teresa is married to Mats Jansson and has two daughters named Annika and Emma. Toni is married to Tim Tanimura and they have two daughters named Samantha and Keilani. Jeffrey has a partner named Bill. Angie Yoingco is the third oldest (deceased) and was never married or had children. Reynaldo (Dinky) Yoingco is the youngest and only son of Katy, and he was a very talented dancer. He was married to Rosie (deceased). Dinky's children include Michael, Timothy, Mark, Patrick, Kelly, Mariane, Marijo and Mutya. .<personal family member>

See also
Katy! the Musical

Notes

References

External links

1907 births
2004 deaths
Filipino women pop singers
Filipino people of Spanish descent
Filipino jazz singers
Filipino film actresses
Filipino television actresses
Filipino stage actresses
Singers from Bulacan
Actresses from Bulacan
20th-century Filipino women singers
Filipino emigrants to the United States